Barberà del Vallès is a municipality in the comarca of the Vallès Occidental, in the province of Barcelona, Spain. It is situated in the valley of the Ripoll river to the south of Sabadell, about 17 kilometers from Barcelona. It's integrated in the Metropolitan Area of Barcelona.

Present 
Barberà del Vallès is a city of more than 30,000 people. In the industrial field, it is one of the main cities of the region of Western Valley (Vallés Occidental), with a clear division between the urban and industrial area. The population of the city, enlarged by the internal migration movements in the Spain of the sixties, is varied and promotes cultural and folkloric associations. This can be seen in the April Fair (Feria de Abril), held until the 1980s in Barberà del Vallès, until economic reasons moved it to other locations in the Barcelona metropolitan area.

Barbera in 1985 celebrated its millennium, which coincided with the opening of the Millennium Square in the vicinity of La Romànica, with balconies to Ripoll river and its riverside park.

Demography

Notable people
Agus Medina (born 1994), professional footballer

References

 Panareda Clopés, Josep Maria; Rios Calvet, Jaume; Rabella Vives, Josep Maria (1989). Guia de Catalunya, Barcelona: Caixa de Catalunya.  (Spanish).  (Catalan).

External links 
Official website 
 Government data pages 

Municipalities in Vallès Occidental
Populated places in Vallès Occidental